Stairway to Heaven: The Best of Neil Sedaka is a 2004 compilation CD album containing the works of American pop star Neil Sedaka. The songs on this album come from the period of 1959-1964, when Sedaka was affiliated with RCA Victor records. This CD was issued by BMG Special Markets.

Track listing
 "Oh! Carol" (1959)
 "Stupid Cupid" (1959)
 "Stairway To Heaven" (1960)
 "Run Samson Run" (1960)
 "Little Devil" (1961)
 "Breaking Up Is Hard To Do" (1962)
 "Alice In Wonderland" (1963)
 "The Dreamer" (1963)
 "Sunny" (1964)
 "All the Way" (1961)

2004 compilation albums
Neil Sedaka compilation albums